Harold Henry Rowley (24 March 1890 – 4 October 1969) was an English Old Testament scholar from the Baptist tradition.

Biography
H. H. Rowley was born in Leicester on 24 March 1890 to Richard Rowley and Emma (née Saunt) Rowley. The family Baptist church was Melbourne Hall, Leicester, previously led by F. B. Meyer and William F. Fullerton. These beginnings profoundly affected and formed Rowley's churchmanship, theology and missional interests. His childhood education was at Wyggeston School, Leicester. He studied at the Bristol Baptist College, gaining a B.D. (overseen by University College London) and B.A. and at Mansfield College, Oxford, earning a B.Litt.

Initially starting his career in 1916 as church minister at Wells, Somerset, he then became a missionary to China with the Baptist Missionary Society. His academic career started with a position in 1935 as Professor of Hebrew and Semitic Languages at University College, Bangor, serving from 1935 to 1945. He saw out his formal academic career with the chair of Semitic languages at Manchester University, eventually retiring in 1956.

He was the editor of the Journal of Semitic Studies from 1956 to 1960. From 1946 he led the Society for Old Testament Study as its Secretary (1946–60) and served as its president for the year 1950.

He lived in Stroud, Gloucestershire, until his death on 4 October 1969.

Works

 – Repr. 1959

 – 2nd ed. (1947) – 3rd ed. (1953)

 (2nd edition 1961)

References

External links
 
H.H. Rowley (1890–1969)

British biblical scholars
Old Testament scholars
20th-century English theologians
1890 births
1969 deaths
People educated at Wyggeston Grammar School for Boys
Alumni of University College London

Alumni of Mansfield College, Oxford
Academics of Bangor University
Academics of the University of Manchester
Academic journal editors
English Baptists
Presidents of the Society for Old Testament Study